State budgetary educational institution of Moscow city "Pushkinsky lyceum №1500" - is a lyceum situated in the center of Moscow.

History 
Pushkinsky lyceum №1500 was established on 1 September 1999 by the initiative of academic D.S.Likhachev. It was opened to the bicentenary of the birth of Pushkin.

In 2011 Pushkinsky lyceum №1500 was united with the school №1481 and from that time it had two buildings (the one on the Milutinsky lane, the second one on the Sretensky boulevard). Children, who were in the 1-9 grades, studied in the second building. Children, who were in 10-11 grades, studied in the first building.

In 2015 Pushkinsky lyceum №1500 was united with State budgetary educational institution of Moscow city secondary school №1652, State budgetary educational institution of Moscow city secondary school  №282, State budgetary educational institution of Moscow city kindergarten №115, State budgetary educational institution of Moscow city kindergarten №1042, State budgetary educational institution of Moscow city kindergarten  №927, State budgetary educational institution of Moscow city kindergarten №37. The full name of this union remains Pushkinsky lyceum №1500.

Traditions 
Every year "Likhachev readings" take place in Pushkinsky lyceum №1500. It is an event where students are made into groups according to the subject they want to talk about (e.g. biology, history, Russian etc.). Every year they talk about specific topic.

Education 
In Pushkinsky lyceum №1500 students get full secondary education. The statistics show that the majority of students go to the university after graduating from Pushkinsky lyceum №1500. Every year half of the graduators receives higher education on the budget basis (at the expense of the state).

References

External links 
 Official web site

Lyceums in Russia
Schools in Moscow
Educational institutions established in 1999
1999 establishments in Russia